Loïc Dombreval (born 16 April 1966) is a French veterinarian and politician of La République En Marche! (LREM) who was elected to the French National Assembly on 18 June 2017, representing the department of Alpes-Maritimes.

Early career
Dombreval worked as a veterinarian from 1990 until 1995 before taking on the position of communications director at Virbac's French subsidiary in 1995. From 1999) until 2000, he was a strategy consultant at Capgemini.

Political career
Having previously been an active member of the Democratic Movement (MoDem), Dombreval joined LREM in 2017.

In parliament, Dombreval serves on the Committee on Sustainable Development and Spatial Planning. In this capacity, he is the parliament's rapporteur on animal welfare and rights in France, including a 2021 ban on the use of wild animals in live circus shows.

In addition to his committee assignments, Dombreval is a member of the French-Namibian Parliamentary Friendship Group.

Political positions
In July 2019, Dombreval decided not to align with his parliamentary group's majority and became one of 52 LREM members who abstained from a vote on the French ratification of the European Union’s Comprehensive Economic and Trade Agreement (CETA) with Canada.

In 2021, Dombreval led efforts to ban the practice of marmot hunting in France.

See also
 2017 French legislative election

References

1966 births
Living people
Deputies of the 15th National Assembly of the French Fifth Republic
La République En Marche! politicians
People from Boulogne-Billancourt